The RIM-174 Standard Extended Range Active Missile (ERAM), or Standard Missile 6 (SM-6), is a missile in current production for the United States Navy. It was designed for extended-range anti-air warfare (ER-AAW) purposes, providing capability against fixed and rotary-wing aircraft, unmanned aerial vehicles, anti-ship cruise missiles in flight, both over sea and land, and terminal ballistic missile defense. It can also be used as a high-speed anti-ship missile. The missile uses the airframe of the earlier SM-2ER Block IV (RIM-156A) missile, adding the active radar homing seeker from the AIM-120C AMRAAM in place of the semi-active seeker of the previous design. This will improve the capability of the Standard missile against highly agile targets and targets beyond the effective range of the launching vessels' target illumination radars. Initial operating capability was planned for 2013 and was achieved on 27 November 2013. The SM-6 is not meant to replace the SM-2 series of missiles but will serve alongside and provide extended range and increased firepower. It was approved for export in January 2017.

Description 

The Standard ERAM is a two-stage missile with a booster stage and a second stage. It is similar in appearance to the RIM-156A Standard missile. The radar seeker is an enlarged version adapted from the AIM-120C AMRAAM seeker ( versus ). The missile may be employed in a number of modes: inertially guided to target with terminal acquisition using active radar seeker, semi-active radar homing all the way, or an over-the-horizon shot with Cooperative Engagement Capability. The missile is also capable of terminal ballistic missile defense as a supplement to the Standard Missile 3 (RIM-161). Unlike other missiles of the Standard family, the Standard ERAM can be periodically tested and certified without removal from the vertical launching system.

The SM-6 offers extended range over previous SM-2 series missiles, primarily being able to intercept very high altitude or sea-skimming anti-ship missiles, and is also capable of performing terminal phase ballistic missile defense. The SM-6 can also function as a high-speed anti-ship missile. It can discriminate targets using its dual-mode seeker, with the semi-active seeker relying on a ship-based illuminator to highlight the target and the active seeker having the missile itself send out an electromagnetic signal; the active seeker has the ability to detect a land-based cruise missile amid ground features, even from behind a mountain. The multi-mission SM-6 is engineered with the aerodynamics of an SM-2, the propulsion booster stack of the SM-3, and the front-end configuration of the AMRAAM.

The U.S. Navy is adding GPS guidance to the SM-6 Block IA so that it has the capability to strike surface targets if needed. However, given its higher cost than other land attack weapons like the Tomahawk cruise missile, it would not likely be used as a primary option. In February 2016, Secretary of Defense Ashton Carter confirmed that the SM-6 would be modified to act as an anti-ship weapon.

On 17 January 2018, the U.S. Navy approved plans to develop the SM-6 Block IB, which will feature a 53.34 cm (21-inch) rocket motor instead of the current 34.29 cm (13.5 inch) motor. The new variant will significantly increase the missile's range and speed, enabling a hypersonic and extended-range anti-surface warfare capability.

In November 2020, the U.S. Army selected the SM-6 to fulfill its Mid-Range Capability (MRC), giving it a land-based long-range missile capable of striking ground targets. The Army plans to use the SM-6 alongside a ground-based Tomahawk cruise missile and field them by late 2023.

History 
Raytheon entered a contract in 2004 to develop the missile for the United States Navy after the cancellation of the Standard Missile 2 extended range block IVA (RIM-156B). Development started in 2005, followed by testing in 2007. The missile was officially designated RIM-174A in February 2008. Initial low rate production was authorized in 2009. Raytheon received a $93 million contract to begin production of the RIM-174A in September 2009. The first low-rate production missile was delivered in March 2011. SM-6 was approved for full-rate production in May 2013. On 27 November 2013, the Standard ERAM achieved IOC (Initial Operating Capability) when it was fielded on board .

During exercises from 18–20 June 2014, the Arleigh Burke-class destroyer  fired four SM-6s. One part of the exercise, designated NIFC-CA AS-02A, resulted in the then-longest surface-to-air engagement in naval history; the exact range of the intercept was not publicly released. On 14 August 2014, an SM-6 was test fired against a subsonic, low-altitude cruise missile target and successfully intercepted it over land. A key element of the test was to assess its ability to discern a slow-moving target among ground clutter. On 24 October 2014, Raytheon announced that two SM-6s intercepted anti-ship and cruise missile targets during "engage on remote" scenarios. A low-altitude, short-range supersonic GQM-163A and a low-altitude, medium-range subsonic BQM-74E were shot down by SM-6s fired from a guided-missile cruiser using targeting information provided by a guided-missile destroyer. Advanced warning and cueing from other ships allows the missile's over-the-horizon capability to be used to a greater extent, allowing a single ship to defend a much larger area. In May 2015, the SM-6 was moved from low-rate to full-rate production, significantly increasing production numbers and further reducing unit cost.

On 28 July 2015, the Navy tested the modified SM-6 Dual I version to successfully intercept a ballistic missile target in the terminal phase, the last few seconds before it would impact; the Dual I upgrade adds a more powerful processor that runs more sophisticated targeting software to hit a warhead descending from the upper atmosphere at extreme speed. This adds to the fleet's missile defense capabilities by allowing it to intercept ballistic missiles that could not be hit by SM-3 missiles, which target missiles in the midcourse phase. The Navy had used the SM-2 Block IV as a terminal ballistic interceptor, but the SM-6 combines missile defense with traditional cruise missile and aircraft interdiction in the same package. The SM-6 Dual I configuration is planned to enter service in 2016.

In January 2016, the SM-6 demonstrated both maximum down range and maximum cross-range intercepts in over-the-horizon, engage-on-remote missions supported by CEC, breaking the previous maximum engagement record it set in June 2014. Five targets were shot down in the test, proving the missile's capability to conduct multiple target scenarios. The SM-6 also sunk the decommissioned  in an 18 January 2016 demonstration, displaying its anti-ship capabilities. On 30 September 2016, Raytheon announced that the SM-6 had again achieved the longest surface-to-air intercept in naval history, breaking its previous long-range intercept record made in January 2016. On 14 December 2016, the Missile Defense Agency successfully launched two SM-6 Dual I missiles at a "complex, medium-range ballistic missile target", proving that its explosive—rather than hit-to-kill—warhead was capable of defeating medium-range ballistic missile threats; this ability may enable it to counter Chinese DF-21D and DF-26B anti-ship ballistic missile threats.

In August 2017, the Missile Defense Agency conducted another successful intercept test of a medium-range ballistic missile (MRBM). Two SM-6 Dual I missiles were launched from USS John Paul Jones to intercept a target MRBM launched from the Pacific Missile Range Facility during the terminal phase of its flight. The test marked the third successful intercept of a ballistic missile by the SM-6.

In April 2021, USS John Finn used an SM-6 to strike a simulated naval target 250 miles away. In the same month, a Super Hornet was photographed carrying what appeared to be an SM-6 while in flight.

On 27 May 2021, the Russian Navy ship Kareliya (SSV-535), a Vishnya-class auxiliary general intelligence (AGI) ship operating near Pacific Missile Range Facility, caused the delay of the Flight Test Aegis Weapon System. 
On 29 May 2021, Flight Test Aegis Weapon System 31 Event 1, a salvo of two SM-6 Dual II missiles failed to intercept two medium-range ballistic missiles; only one MRBM was intercepted.

Operators

Current 
 United States
United States Navy
 Japan
Japan Maritime Self-Defense Force

Future 
 Australia
Royal Australian Navy
 South Korea
Republic of Korea Navy

See also 

 RIM-66 Standard Medium Range
 RIM-67 Standard Extended Range
 RIM-161 Standard Missile 3

References

External links 
 http://www.globalsecurity.org/military/systems/munitions/sm-6.htm
 http://www.designation-systems.net/dusrm/m-174.html
 http://www.navy.mil/navydata/fact_display.asp?cid=2200&tid=1200&ct=2 

Naval surface-to-air missiles
Naval surface-to-air missiles of the United States
Surface-to-air missiles
Naval weapons of the United States
Surface-to-air missiles of the United States
Military equipment introduced in the 2010s